Forvika or Forvik is the administrative centre of the municipality of Vevelstad in Nordland county, Norway.  Forsvika sits on the coastline along the Vevelstadsundet strait, just north of Vevelstad Church.  Forvika is the southern terminus of the Tjøtta-Forvika ferry line which is part of the Norwegian County Road 17.

References

Villages in Nordland
Vevelstad